The 2009 season is Club Social y Deportivo Colo-Colo's 78th season at Chilean Primera División. This article shows player statistics and all matches (official and friendly) that the club have played during the 2009 season.

Players

Squad information

Matches

Torneo Apertura

Standings

Regular stage

Results summary

Torneo Clausura

Standings

Regular stage

Results summary

Play-offs
Quarter-finals

Semi-finals

Finals

Copa Chile

Copa Libertadores

Friendlies and other matches

References

2009
Colo-Colo
Colo